The Mirror of Fate is a 1999 fantasy novel by T. A. Barron published by Penguin. The Mirror of Fate is the fourth book in a 12-book series known as The Merlin Saga. This book was originally published as The Mirror of Merlin, book four of The Lost Years of Merlin epic, a 5-book series providing a childhood story for the legendary Merlin, wizard of Arthurian legend.

In a remote swamp on the magical isle of Fincayra, uncommon wickedness arises.  Young Merlin must journey to terrifying places - both within himself as well as on land - to save both his homeland, and his own destiny.

Accompanied by the deer-woman he has come to love, Hallia, and his own roguish shadow, Merlin discovers "a magical mirror that can alter anyone's fate."  The person Merlin beholds upon gazing into the mirror is the person he least expects to find.

American children's novels
Works based on Merlin
Modern Arthurian fiction
Children's fantasy novels
American young adult novels
1999 American novels
1999 children's books